Enrico Fermi (1901–1954) was an Italian physicist who created the world's first nuclear reactor.

Fermi or Enrico Fermi may also refer to:
 Fermi (crater), a large lunar impact crater
 Fermi (microarchitecture), a microarchitecture developed by Nvidia
 Fermi (supercomputer), located at CINECA in Italy
 Fermi (Turin Metro), a rapid transit station in Italy
 Fermi (unit), a unit of length in nuclear physics equivalent to the femtometre
 RA-1 Enrico Fermi, a research reactor in Argentina
 Fermi Gamma-ray Space Telescope
 Enrico Fermi Institute, Chicago, Illinois, US
 Fermi Linux, distributions produced by Fermilab
 FERMI, a free-electron laser at the ELETTRA research centre

People with the surname
 Laura Fermi (1907–1977), Enrico Fermi's wife

See also
 Enrico Fermi Award
 Fermi–Dirac (disambiguation)
 Fermi Paradox (album), an album by Tub Ring
 Fermi–Pasta–Ulam–Tsingou problem
 Fermi problem
 Fermi–Walker differentiation
 Fermi–Walker transport
 FERMIAC, an analog computer invented by Enrico Fermi
 Fermilab, Fermi National Accelerator Laboratory
 Fermion
 Fermionic field
 Fermium, the 100th element on the periodic table
 List of things named after Enrico Fermi